2009 Belarusian First League was the nineteenth season of 2nd level football championship in Belarus. It started in April and ended in November 2008.

Team changes from 2008 season
The winners of last season (Minsk) were promoted to Belarusian Premier League. Due to reduction of Premier League, the promoted team was replaced by three teams that finished at the bottom of 2008 Belarusian Premier League table (Lokomotiv Minsk, Savit Mogilev and Darida Minsk Raion).

One team that finished at the bottom of 2008 season table (PMC Postavy) relegated to the Second League. They were replaced by the best team of 2008 Second League (DSK Gomel).

Two of the three teams that relegated from Premier League (Savit Mogilev and Darida Minsk Raion) disbanded during the off-season. No teams were invited to replace them, and the planned First League expansion from 14 to 16 clubs did not happen.

Lokomotiv Minsk changed their name to SKVICH Minsk and Dinamo-Belcard Grodno shortened their name to Belcard Grodno prior to the season.

Teams and locations

League table

Top goalscorers

See also
2009 Belarusian Premier League
2008–09 Belarusian Cup
2009–10 Belarusian Cup

External links
RSSSF

Belarusian First League seasons
2
Belarus
Belarus